Verkhovye is the name of several inhabited localities in Russia.

Arkhangelsk Oblast
As of 2010, three rural localities in Arkhangelsk Oblast bear this name:
Verkhovye, Nyandomsky District, Arkhangelsk Oblast, a village in Limsky Selsoviet of Nyandomsky District
Verkhovye, Onezhsky District, Arkhangelsk Oblast, a village in Chekuyevsky Selsoviet of Onezhsky District
Verkhovye, Primorsky District, Arkhangelsk Oblast, a village in Patrakeyevsky Selsoviet of Primorsky District

Kaluga Oblast
As of 2010, four rural localities in Kaluga Oblast bear this name:
Verkhovye (Yubileyny Rural Settlement), Maloyaroslavetsky District, Kaluga Oblast, a village in Maloyaroslavetsky District; municipally, a part of Yubileyny Rural Settlement of that district
Verkhovye (Maklino Rural Settlement), Maloyaroslavetsky District, Kaluga Oblast, a village in Maloyaroslavetsky District; municipally, a part of Maklino Rural Settlement of that district
Verkhovye (Zakharovo Rural Settlement), Maloyaroslavetsky District, Kaluga Oblast, a village in Maloyaroslavetsky District; municipally, a part of Zakharovo Rural Settlement of that district
Verkhovye, Zhukovsky District, Kaluga Oblast, a village in Zhukovsky District

Republic of Karelia
As of 2010, two rural localities in the Republic of Karelia bear this name:
Verkhovye, Olonetsky District, Republic of Karelia, a village in Olonetsky District
Verkhovye, Prionezhsky District, Republic of Karelia, a village in Prionezhsky District

Kostroma Oblast
As of 2010, one rural locality in Kostroma Oblast bears this name:
Verkhovye, Kostroma Oblast, a selo in Burdukovskoye Settlement of Soligalichsky District

Leningrad Oblast
As of 2010, three rural localities in Leningrad Oblast bear this name:
Verkhovye, Podborovskoye Settlement Municipal Formation, Boksitogorsky District, Leningrad Oblast, a village in Podborovskoye Settlement Municipal Formation of Boksitogorsky District
Verkhovye, Samoylovskoye Settlement Municipal Formation, Boksitogorsky District, Leningrad Oblast, a village in Samoylovskoye Settlement Municipal Formation of Boksitogorsky District
Verkhovye, Tikhvinsky District, Leningrad Oblast, a village in Shugozerskoye Settlement Municipal Formation of Tikhvinsky District

Moscow Oblast
As of 2010, two rural localities in Moscow Oblast bear this name:
Verkhovye, Pervomayskoye Rural Settlement, Naro-Fominsky District, Moscow Oblast, a village in Pervomayskoye Rural Settlement of Naro-Fominsky District
Verkhovye, Volchenkovskoye Rural Settlement, Naro-Fominsky District, Moscow Oblast, a village in Volchenkovskoye Rural Settlement of Naro-Fominsky District

Novgorod Oblast
As of 2010, one rural locality in Novgorod Oblast bears this name:
Verkhovye, Novgorod Oblast, a village in Borkovskoye Settlement of Novgorodsky District

Oryol Oblast
As of 2010, two inhabited localities in Oryol Oblast bear this name.

Urban localities
Verkhovye, Verkhovsky District, Oryol Oblast, an urban-type settlement in Verkhovsky District

Rural localities
Verkhovye, Galichinsky Selsoviet, Verkhovsky District, Oryol Oblast, a village in Galichinsky Selsoviet of Verkhovsky District

Smolensk Oblast
As of 2010, five rural localities in Smolensk Oblast bear this name:
Verkhovye, Dorogobuzhsky District, Smolensk Oblast, a village in Aleksinskoye Rural Settlement of Dorogobuzhsky District
Verkhovye, Kholm-Zhirkovsky District, Smolensk Oblast, a village in Tomskoye Rural Settlement of Kholm-Zhirkovsky District
Verkhovye, Smolensky District, Smolensk Oblast, a village in Novoselskoye Rural Settlement of Smolensky District
Verkhovye, Belyayevskoye Rural Settlement, Velizhsky District, Smolensk Oblast, a village in Belyayevskoye Rural Settlement of Velizhsky District
Verkhovye, Budnitskoye Rural Settlement, Velizhsky District, Smolensk Oblast, a village in Budnitskoye Rural Settlement of Velizhsky District

Tula Oblast
As of 2010, one rural locality in Tula Oblast bears this name:
Verkhovye, Tula Oblast, a village in Gvardeysky Rural Okrug of Dubensky District

Tver Oblast
As of 2010, one rural locality in Tver Oblast bears this name:
Verkhovye, Tver Oblast, a village in Belsky District

Vologda Oblast
As of 2010, eight rural localities in Vologda Oblast bear this name:
Verkhovye, Babayevsky District, Vologda Oblast, a village in Saninsky Selsoviet of Babayevsky District
Verkhovye, Belozersky District, Vologda Oblast, a village in Sholsky Selsoviet of Belozersky District
Verkhovye, Korotovsky Selsoviet, Cherepovetsky District, Vologda Oblast, a village in Korotovsky Selsoviet of Cherepovetsky District
Verkhovye, Shalimovsky Selsoviet, Cherepovetsky District, Vologda Oblast, a selo in Shalimovsky Selsoviet of Cherepovetsky District
Verkhovye, Gryazovetsky District, Vologda Oblast, a village in Sidorovsky Selsoviet of Gryazovetsky District
Verkhovye, Kaduysky District, Vologda Oblast, a village in Chuprinsky Selsoviet of Kaduysky District
Verkhovye, Nyuksensky District, Vologda Oblast, a village in Brusnovolovsky Selsoviet of Nyuksensky District
Verkhovye, Vytegorsky District, Vologda Oblast, a village in Megorsky Selsoviet of Vytegorsky District

Voronezh Oblast
As of 2010, one rural locality in Voronezh Oblast bears this name:
Verkhovye, Voronezh Oblast, a khutor in Skupopotudanskoye Rural Settlement of Nizhnedevitsky District